Sáile (anglicized as Salia or Saula) is a small Gaeltacht village on an easterly peninsula of Achill Island in County Mayo, Ireland. The village has a national school (founded in 1910). Villages neighboring Sáile include Gob an Choire and An Caiseal.

References

External links 
 Achill Tourism

Villages in Achill Island
Gaeltacht places in County Mayo